Laura Veldkamp (born July 14, 1975) is an American economist teaching as a professor of finance at Columbia University's Graduate School of Business and also serves as a co-editor of the Journal of Economic Theory.

Education 
Veldkamp graduated with a Bachelor of Arts in Math and Economics from Northwestern University in 1996. She then received her Ph.D. in Economic Analysis and Policy from the Stanford Graduate School of Business in 2001.

Career

Early career 
Veldkamp started her teaching career as an assistant professor of economics at INSEAD for 3 years from 2001 to 2003. She then taught at New York University Stern School of Business as an assistant professor of economics from 2003 to 2008. Before being promoted to an associate professor of economics at New York University Stern School of Business. She left New York University in 2015, after 15 years to join Columbia University's Graduate School of Business. During this time, she was also employed at the Hoover Institution National Fellow located within Stanford University from 2010 to 2011 and the Kenen Fellow within the Department of Economics at Princeton University from 2006 to 2007.

Current career 
She is on the New York University Stern Committees since 2007, with responsibilities including financial oversight, obtaining tenure, and teaching at Ph.D. programs. Veldkamp obtained a National Bureau of Economic Research faculty research fellow in 2008, and a research fellow at Center for Economic and Policy Research since 2009. From 2009 to 2011, she was an associate editor for the Journal of Monetary Economics. In 2011, she became a coordinator for the Economic Fluctuations, Growth, and Development research group in the New York University Stern Center for Global Economy and Business. In 2014, she joined the National Bureau of Economic Research (NBER) Macro Annual Editorial Board. Then in 2016, she joined the Board of Editors at the American Economic Journal in the Microeconomics division. She most recently joined the Monetary Policy Advisory Panel in the New York Federal Reserve.

She currently teaches at Columbia University's Graduate School of Business where she holds the Leon G Cooperman Chair Professorship of Finance and serves as a co-editor of the Journal of Economic Theory.

In 2022, Veldkamp was elected a fellow of the Econometric Society.

Research 
Veldkamp's research varies from macroeconomics, monetary economics, international finance, and asset pricing. It focuses on how individuals, investors, and firms obtain information, and how that information influences their decisions, and how those decisions change the macroeconomy and financial markets. Some of her other work investigates how women choose to participate in the labor force, and how women observe influences that contribute to employment patterns that reflects the "geographic patterns of female labor force participation in the United States". She also explores how research for investments are done by mutual fund managers.

Publications 
Veldkamp has published multiple works in outlets such as The American Economic Review, The Review of Economic Studies, The Journal of Finance, Journal of Economic Theory, and the Journal of Monetary Economics.

A collaboration on the paper "Leadership, Coordination and Corporate Culture" with economists Patrick Bolton from Columbia University and Markus K. Brunnermeier from Princeton University, was awarded the 2008 JP Morgan Price for the best paper at the Utah Winter Finance Conference. It was then printed in the Review of Economic Studies in April 2013, in volume 80(2), from pages 512–537. It was regarding the role of leaders in large organizations, in which a model of leadership was proposed to help manage corporate culture in large organizations, coordinate followers' actions over time, and help to steer an organization when faced with changing environments.

Veldkamp also collaborated with economist Vasiliki Skreta from New York University on the paper "Ratings Shopping and Asset Complexity: A Theory of Ratings Inflation", which was awarded 3rd place by the Glucksman Institute Research Prize. It was also published in the Journal of Monetary Economics in July 2009, in volume 56(5), from pages 678–695. The paper regards the emergence of rating bias, and how more competition in the ratings market can continuously distort ratings, as well as how investors can no longer use past data to detect rating bias. An economic model was introduced to help explain the situation. A key assumption of the model was that investors were unaware of the rise of asset complexity and were also creating ratings bias.

Veldkamp's most awarded paper was "Information Immobility and the Home Bias Puzzle", written in collaboration with economist Stijn Van Nieuwerburgh. It was awarded 1st place by the Glucksman Institute Research Prize, and was also awarded the best paper prize in investments by the Financial Management Association. It was published in The Journal of Finance in June 2009, in volume 63(3), from pages 1187–1215. The paper studies the criticism regarding information-based models of the home bias and attempts to answer the question "If home investors have less information about foreign stocks, why don't they choose to acquire foreign information, reduce their uncertainty about foreign payoffs, and undo their portfolio bias?" The study shows a model of investors deciding which risky asset payoff to study. It then dives into the world of asymmetric information, where investors pursue the incentive to purposefully learn and obtain information that others do not know. Showing that investors choose to have different information than other investors.

Veldkamp is the author of the textbook Information Choice in Macroeconomics and Finance, printed by the Princeton University Press. The textbook highlights how information choice can be used to answer questions regarding "monetary economics, portfolio choice theory, business cycle theory, international finance, asset pricing, and other areas." It also covers how information friction can be used to build and test applied theory models, and includes recent research topics such as "rational inattention, information markets, and strategic games with heterogeneous information."

References 

Living people
1975 births
Stanford Graduate School of Business alumni
Columbia University faculty
21st-century American economists
American women economists
New York University Stern School of Business faculty
Northwestern University alumni
21st-century American women
Fellows of the Econometric Society